Premolis semirufa is a moth in the family Erebidae first described by Francis Walker in 1856. It is found in French Guiana, Brazil, Ecuador, Peru and Panama.

References

Phaegopterina
Moths described in 1856